Northern Lights (Siyaniye Severa ) is a natural gas pipeline system in Russia and Belarus. It is one of the main pipelines supplying north-western Russia and is an important transit route for Russian gas to Europe.

History
The Northern Lights pipeline system was built in the Soviet Union from the 1960s to 1980s. Construction of the Vuktyl–Ukhta–Gryazovets–Torzhok section started in 1967 and was completed in 1969.  By 1974, the pipeline had been extended to Minsk.  The second main trunk line was added during the 1970s and by 1985, a third main trunk line had been built.  Originally, gas was supplied by the Vukhtyl gas field, but later the pipeline was extended in order to connect with the Urengoy gas field.

Technical description

The pipeline runs from the Urengoy gas field through Vuktyl, Ukhta, Gryazovets, Torzhok and Smolensk to Minsk in Belarus and from there to Poland, Ukraine and Lithuania. A part of the newer Yamal–Europe pipeline runs parallel to the Northern Lights pipeline. A branch line from Gryazovets through Saint Petersburg to Vyborg supplies the Saint Petersburg area and Finland. A third parallel line will be added to this branch to supply the Nord Stream 1 pipeline. In Torzhok, the Northern Lights pipeline intersects with the Moscow–Saint Petersburg pipeline supplying the Saint Petersburg area, Latvia and Estonia. The Minsk–Vilnius–Kaliningrad branch line supplies Lithuania and Kaliningrad Oblast while the Ivatsevichy-Dolyna branch line supplies Ukraine and the Kobrin-Brest-Warsaw branch line supplies Poland.

The system from Torzhok to the West consists of five major trunk pipelines:

This part of the system has 6 compressors stations. Its technical input capacity is 51 billion cubic meters (bcm) per year; however, due to the age of the pipeline system, its operational capability is estimated to be 46-48 bcm per year. In 2007, it transported 39 bcm of gas; 20.6  bcm to Belarus for domestic supply and 18.4 bcm for transit to Europe. The total amount of Russian gas transmitted through Belarus to Europe was 70.1 bcm in 2007.

Ownership
The Russian section of the pipeline system is a part of the unified gas system of Russia and is owned and operated by Gazprom. The pipeline section on the territory of Belarus became Belarusian property after the dissolution of the Soviet Union, and is now owned and operated by Beltransgaz.

References

Energy infrastructure completed in 1985
Natural gas pipelines in Russia
Natural gas pipelines in Belarus
Gazprom pipelines
Natural gas pipelines in the Soviet Union
Belarus–Russia relations